Dufriche-Desgenettes or  Dufriche Desgenettes is a surname. Notable people with the surname include:

Antoni Dufriche-Desgenettes (1804–1878), French phonetician
René-Nicolas Dufriche Desgenettes (1762–1837), French military doctor

French-language surnames
Compound surnames